The Autograph Man, published in 2002, is the second novel by Zadie Smith.  It follows the progress of a Jewish-Chinese Londoner named Alex-Li Tandem, who buys and sells autographs for a living and is obsessed with celebrities. Eventually, his obsession culminates in a meeting with the elusive American-Russian actress Kitty Alexander, a star from Hollywood's Golden Age.  In 2003, the novel won the Jewish Quarterly-Wingate Literary Prize. The novel was a commercial success, but was not as well received by readers and critics as her previous and first novel, White Teeth (2000). Smith has stated that before she started work on The Autograph Man she had writer's block.

Reception

As with her first novel, White Teeth, the critic James Wood was harsh. He said: "this is the closest a contemporary British writer has come to sounding like a contemporary American writer – the result is disturbingly mutant." He denounced her "cute digest chapter headings", her "silly epigraphs", her "informational interpolations" and her vacant main character. He also felt that the novel's "obsession" with Jewishness, and the way in which the subject was treated, made it clear that the book was by a non-Jew. Furthermore, he said that "she seems to like (Alex Li-Tandem, the protagonist) much more than we do", and he speculated that he was actually a reflection of herself. At the conclusion, he did mention that certain sentences displayed brilliance, but these were not enough to save the novel.

References 

2002 British novels
English novels
Novels set in London
Hamish Hamilton books
Novels by Zadie Smith